Finningley is a village and civil parish in the City of Doncaster, South Yorkshire, England. Historically in Nottinghamshire, it lies on the A614 road between Bawtry and Thorne, about 6 miles south-east of Doncaster. In the 2011 census, it had a population of 1,497. The Finningley ward of Doncaster Metropolitan Borough Council covers 16.8 square miles, including the villages of Auckley, Branton, Blaxton, Hayfield and Bessacarr Grange, and part of Cantley.

History
The parish church of Holy Trinity is Norman, with a 13th-century chancel.

The place name Finningley contains the Old English word, fenn, a fen, a marsh, marshland + -ingas (Old English), the people of...; the people called after... + lēah (Old English), a glade, clearing; (later) a pasture, meadow... so a "Clearing of the fen-dwellers".

Airport
Finningley is known for its airport, once RAF Finningley. The station housed a 'V' force of Vulcan bombers in the Cold War, and for 35 years hosted a regular air show, which by the 1990s was the country's largest one-day event of its kind. However, the end of the Cold War led to the airfield closing in April 1996 and the air show coming to an end.

Plans for the conversion were approved in 2003 and the first flights served in April 2005. The airport was named Robin Hood Airport Doncaster Sheffield, then renamed Doncaster Sheffield Airport. In November 2022 it closed to passenger traffic. Planning permission had been given for a railway station – the former Finningley railway station, which closed in 1961 – but it is now unlikely to be built.

Notable businesses
Leon Motors, a company located in Finningley, operated bus services in Doncaster. Formed in 1922, it was taken over by MASS of North Anston in 2004 but has since ceased operating from the Old Bawtry Road site in Finningley.

Finningley is home to a Motocross venue.

Notable people
Elsie Howey (1884–1963), a leading suffragette, was born here.

See also
Listed buildings in Finningley

References

External links

Robin Hood Airport Doncaster Sheffield
Finningley Village Community Group
Finningley Parish Council

Villages in Doncaster
Civil parishes in South Yorkshire